

Events

May events 
 May 24 – The first rail of the Stockton and Darlington Railway is laid in ceremonial style at Stockton-on-Tees by the Chairman of the company, Thomas Meynell.

November events
 November 18 – The Hetton colliery railway, near Sunderland, England, opens for locomotive traction, being designed by George Stephenson to be wholly steam worked.

Births

September births
 September 16 – Charles Crocker, a member of The Big Four group of financiers in California (d. 1888).

Unknown date births

Deaths

References